Bess Flowers (November 23, 1898 – July 28, 1984) was an American actress best known for her work as an extra in hundreds of films. She was known as "The Queen of the Hollywood Extras," appearing in more than 350 feature films and numerous comedy shorts in her 41-year career.

She holds the record for appearances in films nominated for the Academy Award for Best Picture (23).

Career
Born in Sherman, Texas, Flowers' film debut came in 1923, when she appeared in Hollywood. She made three films that year, and then began working extensively. Many of her appearances are uncredited, as she generally played non-speaking roles.

By the 1930s, Flowers was in constant demand. Her appearances ranged from Alfred Hitchcock and John Ford thrillers to comedic roles alongside of Charley Chase, the Three Stooges, Leon Errol, Edgar Kennedy, and Laurel and Hardy.

She appeared in the following five films which won the Academy Award for Best Picture: It Happened One Night, You Can't Take it with You, All About Eve, The Greatest Show on Earth, and Around the World in Eighty Days. In each of these movies, Flowers was uncredited. Including these five movies, she had appeared in twenty-three Best Picture nominees in total, making her the record holder for most appearances in films nominated for the award. Her last movie was Good Neighbor Sam in 1964.

Flowers's acting career was not confined to feature films. She was also seen in many episodic American TV series, such as I Love Lucy, notably in episodes, "Lucy Is Enceinte" (1952), "Ethel's Birthday" (1955), and "Lucy's Night in Town" (1957), where she is usually seen as a theatre patron.

Outside her acting career, in 1945, Flowers helped to found the Screen Extras Guild (active: 1946–1992, then merged with the Screen Actors Guild), where she served as one of its first vice-presidents and recording secretaries.

Personal life
Flowers was first married on September 2, 1923, in Ventura County, California, to Cullen Tate, an assistant director for Cecil B. DeMille. They had a daughter, and they were divorced in 1928 in Los Angeles.

Death
Flowers died on July 28, 1984, at age 85 in the Motion Picture & Television Country House and Hospital in Woodland Hills, California.

Selected filmography

1920s
 Hollywood (1923)
 The Silent Partner (1923)
 Irene (1926)
 Lone Hand Saunders (1926)
 Hands Across the Border (1926)
 Glenister of the Mounted (1926)
 Old Ironsides (1926) (uncredited)
 Blondes by Choice (1927)
 Show People (1928) (uncredited)
 We Faw Down (1928, Short)
 The Saturday Night Kid (1929) (uncredited)
 Their Own Desire (1929) (uncredited)
1930s
 Ten Cents a Dance (1931)
 Strangers May Kiss (1931) (uncredited)
 A Free Soul (1931) (uncredited)
 Monkey Business (1931) (uncredited)
 Possessed (1931)
 Sinister Hands (1932)
 Sin's Pay Day (1932)
 It Happened One Night (1934) - Agnes, Gordon's Secretary (uncredited)
 One Exciting Adventure (1934)
 The Whole Town's Talking (1935) (uncredited)
 A Night at the Opera (1935) (uncredited)
 Mr. Deeds Goes to Town (1936) (uncredited)
 Forgotten Faces (1936)
 Two-Fisted Gentleman (1936)
 My Man Godfrey (1936) (uncredited)
 Dodsworth (1936) (uncredited)
 Theodora Goes Wild (1936) (uncredited)
 Topper (1937) (uncredited)
 The Awful Truth (1937) (uncredited)
 Nothing Sacred (1937) (uncredited)
 Paid to Dance (1937)
 The Shadow (1937)
 Ever Since Eve (1937) (uncredited)
 Termites of 1938 (1938, Short) - Mrs. Muriel Van Twitchell (uncredited)
 Holiday (1938) (uncredited)
 You Can't Take It With You (1938) (uncredited)
 Mutts to You (1938, Short) - Mrs. Manning
 The Lady Objects (1938)
 Midnight (1939) (uncredited)
 Rose of Washington Square (1939) (uncredited)
 The Roaring Twenties (1939) as a nightclub patron (uncredited)
 Ninotchka (1939) (uncredited)
1940s
 A Plumbing We Will Go (1940, Short) (uncredited)
 The Boys from Syracuse (1940)
 Boom Town (1940) (uncredited)
 Mr. & Mrs. Smith (1941) (uncredited)
 The Lady Eve (1941) (uncredited)
 Meet John Doe (1941) (uncredited)
 Ziegfeld Girl (1941) (uncredited)
 An Ache in Every Stake (1941, Short) - Mrs. Lawrence (uncredited)
 The Man Who Came to Dinner (1942) (uncredited)
 I Married an Angel (1942) (unconfirmed)
 The Palm Beach Story (1942) (uncredited)
 The Glass Key (1942) (uncredited)
 Now, Voyager (1942) (uncredited)
 I Married a Witch (1942) (uncredited)
 Springtime in the Rockies (1942) (uncredited)
 Tahiti Honey (1943) (uncredited)
 Heaven Can Wait (1943) (uncredited)
 Mr. Skeffington (1944) (uncredited)
 Double Indemnity (1944) (uncredited)
 Hail the Conquering Hero (1944) (uncredited)
 Laura (1944) (uncredited)
 The Woman in the Window  (1944) (uncredited)
 Hollywood Canteen (1944) (uncredited)
 A Song for Miss Julie (1945) (uncredited)
 The Affairs of Susan (1945) (uncredited)
 Mildred Pierce (1945) (uncredited)
 Micro-Phonies (1945) (cameo) (uncredited)
 Gilda (1946) (uncredited)
 The Blue Dahlia (1946) (uncredited)
 Notorious (1946) (uncredited)
 The Big Sleep (1946) (uncredited)
 The Razor's Edge (1946) (uncredited)
 Humoresque (1946) (uncredited)
 Dead Reckoning (1947) (uncredited)
 The Farmer's Daughter (1947) (uncredited)
 The Bachelor and the Bobby-Soxer (1947) (uncredited)
 The Secret Life of Walter Mitty (1947) (uncredited)
 Song of the Thin Man (1947)
 Cass Timberlane (1947) (uncredited)
 A Double Life (1947) (uncredited)
 The Bride Goes Wild (1948) (uncredited)
 The Big Clock (1948) (uncredited)
 The Noose Hangs High (1948) (uncredited)
 Romance on the High Seas (1948) (uncredited)
 A Date with Judy (1948) (uncredited)
 A Song Is Born (1948) (uncredited)
 Neptune's Daughter (1949) (uncredited)
 The Great Gatsby (1949) (uncredited)
 Mighty Joe Young (1949) (uncredited)
 Sky Liner (1949)
 My Friend Irma (1949) (uncredited)
1950s
 Young Man with a Horn (1950) (uncredited)
 No Man of Her Own (1950) (uncredited)
 The Damned Don't Cry (1950) (uncredited)
 Father of the Bride (1950) (uncredited)
 Born to Be Bad (1950)
 All About Eve (1950) (uncredited)
 Lullaby of Broadway (1951) (uncredited)
 Show Boat (1951) (uncredited)
 The Greatest Show on Earth (1952) (uncredited)
 Singin' in the Rain (1952) (uncredited)
 The Bad and the Beautiful (1952) (uncredited)
 Angel Face (1953) (uncredited)
 Murder Without Tears (1953) (uncredited)
 Gentlemen Prefer Blondes (1953) (uncredited)
 The Band Wagon (1953) (uncredited)
 The Robe (1953) (uncredited)
 Torch Song (1953) (uncredited)
 Calamity Jane (1953) (uncredited)
 Easy to Love (1953) (uncredited)
 Executive Suite (1953) (uncredited)
 Dial M for Murder (1954) (uncredited)
 The Student Prince (1954) (uncredited)
 Rear Window (1954) (uncredited)
 A Star Is Born (1954) (uncredited)
 White Christmas (1954) (uncredited)
 Désirée (1954) (uncredited)
 Interrupted Melody (1955) (uncredited)
 To Catch a Thief (1955) (uncredited)
 You're Never Too Young (1955)
 Guys and Dolls (1955) (uncredited)
 I'll Cry Tomorrow (1955) (uncredited)
 Ride the High Iron (1956) (uncredited)
 Never Say Goodbye (1956) (uncredited)
 Anything Goes (1956) (uncredited)
 Giant (1956) (uncredited)
 Around the World in 80 Days (1956) (uncredited)
 Funny Face (1957) (uncredited)
 Designing Woman (1957) (uncredited)
 Sweet Smell of Success (1957) (uncredited)
 Jailhouse Rock (1957) (uncredited)
 Pal Joey (1957) (scenes cut)
 Witness for the Prosecution (1957) - courtroom spectator (uncredited)
 Vertigo (1958) (uncredited)
 Houseboat (1958) (uncredited)
 I Married a Monster from Outer Space (1958) (uncredited)
 Imitation of Life (1959) (uncredited)
 North by Northwest (1959) (uncredited)
1960s
 Please Don't Eat the Daisies (1960) (uncredited)
 Where the Boys Are (1960) (uncredited)
 The Absent-Minded Professor (1961) (uncredited)
 Return to Peyton Place (1961) (uncredited)
 Blue Hawaii (1961) (uncredited)
 Judgment at Nuremberg (1961) (uncredited)
 Pocketful of Miracles (1961) (uncredited)
 Sweet Bird of Youth (1962) (uncredited)
 The Manchurian Candidate (1962) (uncredited)
 Who's Minding the Store? (1963) (uncredited)
 Move Over, Darling (1963) (uncredited)
 7 Faces of Dr. Lao (1964) (uncredited)
 The Carpetbaggers (1964) (uncredited)
 Good Neighbor Sam (1964) (uncredited)

See also

References

Further reading

External links

Essay at Senses of Cinema
Bess Flowers at Virtual History

1898 births
1984 deaths
20th-century American actresses
Actresses from Texas
American film actresses
American silent film actresses
People from Sherman, Texas